Middle East Critique is a peer reviewed Middle Eastern studies journal published by Taylor & Francis for the Center for Middle Eastern Studies at Lund University. 

An editorial collective brought out the first issue of Critique: Critical Middle Eastern Studies in the fall of 1992. For the following 18 years, the journal's academic home remained Hamline University, while the name of the journal changed to Middle East Critique in 2009.  Eric Hooglund was appointed as the journal's full-time Editor in January 1995, and from 2002 the journal was published by Taylor and Francis.

External links

References

Middle Eastern studies journals
Publications established in 1992
Quarterly journals
Taylor & Francis academic journals